Miss World Malaysia 2022 was the 54th edition of Miss World Malaysia. The pageant was held at Sipadan Hall, Sabah International Convention Centre, Kota Kinabalu, Sabah. 

Miss World Malaysia 2021, Dr. Lavanya Sivaji crowned her successor, Wenanita Angang at the end of the event. She will be the representative of Malaysia at the upcoming Miss World 2023 pageant.

Pageant

Background 
The pageant was attended by the president of Miss World, Julia Morley as well as Miss World 2021, Karolina Bielawska. She was the first reigning titleholder of Miss World to arrive in Sabah, Malaysia.

Initially, 23 contestants were chosen to compete but only top 15 contestants from all over Malaysia competed for the crown and title. The contestants had the chance to participate in various activities such as philanthropic as well as fun activities in Kota Kinabalu and Kiulu. The media conference, sashing ceremony and photoshoot was held on 23 to 24 August 2022. Hilton Kota Kinabalu have functioned as the accommodation for the contestants during the pageant activities in Sabah.

Selection of Committee 

 Jasebel Robert – Model and Miss Grand Malaysia 2020
 Sanjna Suri – Actress, pharmacist and Miss Supranational Malaysia 2018
 Alexis SueAnn – Actress, host, digital creator and Miss World Malaysia 2019
 Larissa Ping – Social media influencer, fashion blogger and Miss World Malaysia 2018
 Brynn Lovett – ESL teacher and Miss World Malaysia 2015
 Dewi Liana Seriestha – Singer and Miss World Malaysia 2014

Results 
Color keys

State Queens of Beauty

Special awards

Contestants 
23 contestants were chosen to compete but only 15 contestants made it to the finals.

Notes

References

External links 

 

2022 in Malaysia
2022 beauty pageants
2022
Miss World
Events in Malaysia
Events in Sabah